The U.S. 61 Bonnet Carré Spillway Bridge is a twin concrete trestle bridge in the U.S. state of Louisiana. The bridge carries U.S. Route 61 (Airline Highway) over the Bonnet Carré Spillway in St. Charles Parish. The original bridge opened in 1935 serving four narrow lanes of traffic; however, due to frequent traffic congestion and accidents, a parallel span opened in 1984. The original span currently serves eastbound traffic, while the newer span serves westbound traffic.

See also
 
 
 
 List of bridges in the United States

References

External links
 LA DOTD website

Buildings and structures in St. Charles Parish, Louisiana
Transportation in St. Charles Parish, Louisiana
Road bridges in Louisiana
U.S. Route 61
Bridges of the United States Numbered Highway System
Concrete bridges in the United States
Trestle bridges in the United States
1935 establishments in Louisiana
Bridges completed in 1935